Minister of Pensions and National Health was an office in the Cabinet of Canada from 1928 to 1944 who oversaw the Department of Pensions and National Health.

Prior to 1928, certain responsibilities of the Pensions and National Health portfolio were carried out by the now-defunct post of Minister of Soldiers' Civil Re-establishment. That office, along with The Department of Health Act, were abolished and the office of Minister of Pensions and National Health was created on 1928 June 11 by Statute 18-19 George V, c. 39.

In 1944, the portfolio was divided to create the posts of Minister of National Health and Welfare and Minister of Veterans Affairs.

Ministers of Pensions and National Health

References 

Pensions And National Health (Canada)
Pensions And National Health (Canada)
Minister of Pensions and National Health (Canada)
Minister of Pensions and National Health (Canada)